The XVI 2010 Pan Am Badminton Championships were held in Curitiba, Brazil, between October 21 and October 24, 2010.

This event was part of the 2010 BWF Grand Prix Gold and Grand Prix series of the Badminton World Federation.

Venue
Clube Curitibano

Medalists

References

External links
Official website
BWF Tournament Calendar 2010
TournamentSoftware.com: Individual Results
TournamentSoftware.com: Team Results

Pan Am Badminton Championships
Pan Am Badminton Championships
Pan Am Badminton Championships
Badminton tournaments in Brazil
Sport in Curitiba
21st century in Curitiba